Mingun is a town in Sagaing Township of Sagaing Region, north-west Myanmar (Burma), located 11 km up the Ayeyarwady River on the west bank from Mandalay. Its main attraction is the ruined Mingun Pahtodawgyi.

Mingun Pahtodawgyi

The Mingun temple is a monumental uncompleted stupa began by King Bodawpaya in 1790. It was not completed, due to an astrologer claiming that, once the temple was finished, the king would die. Huge cracks are visible on the structure from the earthquake of 23 March 1839. Like many large pagodas in Myanmar, a pondaw paya or working model of the stupa can be seen nearby.

King Bodawpaya also had a gigantic bell cast to go with his huge stupa, the Mingun Bell weighing 90 tons, and is today the largest ringing bell in the world. The weight of the bell in Burmese measurement, is 55,555 viss or peiktha (1 viss = 1.63 kg), handed down as a mnemonic "Min Hpyu Hman Hman Pyaw", with the consonants representing the number 5 in Burmese astronomy and numerology.

Hsinbyume Pagoda

Just a couple of hundred yards from the great stupa and bell lies the beautiful white Hsinbyume or Myatheindan Pagoda with a distinctive architectural style modelled after the mythical Mount Meru (Myinmo taung), built in 1816 by Bodawpaya's grandson and successor Bagyidaw and dedicated to the memory of his first consort Princess Hsinbyume (Lady of the White Elephant, granddaughter of Bodawpaya, 1789–1812) who died in childbirth.

See also
Bodawpaya
Mingun Bell

References

External links

Wanderings in Burma by George W Bird, 1897 F J Bright & Son, London, pp 316A, 318, 318A, 320A inc. old photos of Mingun by Signor Beaton of Mandalay
Col Henry Yule's Remarks on the Senbyu Pagoda at Mengun, 1869 SOAS
The Art and Culture of Burma: The Konbaung Period - Amarapura Dr. Richard M. Cooler, Northern Illinois University
A Trip to Mingun GLOBOsapiens.net, December 26, 2006

Populated places in Sagaing Region